The 2013 season was the Detroit Lions' 84th in the National Football League (NFL), their 80th as the Detroit Lions, as well as the fifth and final under head coach Jim Schwartz, who was fired on December 30. It was also the final season under the ownership of William Clay Ford, Sr., who died in March 2014.

The Lions improved upon their 4–12 record from 2012 when they defeated the Dallas Cowboys in Week 8 to go to 5–3 on the season. Also, their divisional record improved significantly from 2012 (when they were swept by all their divisional rivals).

At the end of Week 10, the Lions were in first place in their division following their first win at Soldier Field since 2007. With their Thanksgiving Day win over the Green Bay Packers, the Lions not only won their first Thanksgiving Day game since 2003, but they also went undefeated in division home games for the first time since 1999.

However despite starting 6–3, the lions suffered a late-season collapse, as the Lions dropped to 3rd place after their loss to the Ravens in Week 15, and then they were eliminated from postseason contention for the second straight year after their loss to the New York Giants in Week 16. They lost their last game as well, ending the season at 7–9.

Offseason

Re-signings

Additions

Retirements

Departures

2013 Draft class

Notes
 The Lions traded their original fourth-round selection (No. 102 overall) along with a 2012 seventh-round selection to the Minnesota Vikings in exchange for the Vikings' 2012 fifth- and seventh-round selections.
 The Lions received two compensatory selections – Nos. 132 and 245 overall.

Final roster

Schedule

Preseason

Regular season

Note: Intra-division opponents are in bold.

Game summaries

Week 1: vs. Minnesota Vikings

The Vikings scored first, and quickly. After the Lions failed on a field goal attempt when new punter/holder Sam Martin fumbled the snap, the Vikings took over on their own 22. On the first play from scrimmage, Adrian Peterson scampered 78 yards for a touchdown. David Akers made it 7–3 on a 33-yard field goal, though the Lions missed out on seven points that series when a touchdown reception by Calvin Johnson was reversed. In the second quarter, Akers connected on a 42-yard field goal to make the score 7–6. The Vikings responded with a 65-yard touchdown drive, capped by a 4-yard TD run from Peterson, to go up 14–6. The Lions closed the gap late in the half when Joique Bell finished off a 70-yard drive with a 1-yard run to make it 14–13. Bell plunged over from the 1-yard line again in the third quarter to put the Lions up for the first time in the game, 20–14. The Vikings' Blair Walsh narrowed the lead to 20–17 with a 52-yard field goal. The Lions then went up 27–17 when Matthew Stafford and new acquisition Reggie Bush connected on a 77-yard pass play. Adrian Peterson scored his third touchdown of the day, on a 4-yard pass from Christian Ponder, to put the Vikings within 3 points again, 27–24. The Lions would get the only score of the fourth quarter, a 1-yard touchdown pass from Stafford to rookie tight end Joseph Fauria, making the final score Detroit 34, Minnesota 24. Reggie Bush had 191 yards from scrimmage on the afternoon (90 rushing, 101 receiving), while Matthew Stafford was 28-of-43 passing for 357 yards, two touchdowns and one interception. After Adrian Peterson's opening 78-yard run, the Lions defense held him to just 15 yards on 17 carries.

Week 2: at Arizona Cardinals

After a scoreless first quarter, the Cardinals struck first on a Jay Feely 47-yard field goal. The Lions responded with a 72-yard touchdown pass from Matthew Stafford to Calvin Johnson, to take a 7–3 lead. The Cardinals went up 10–7 on a 36-yard TD pass from Carson Palmer to Andre Ellington. The Lions retook the lead, 14–10, when Stafford and Johnson connected again, this time on a 3-yard TD pass. Arizona scored first in the third quarter, capitalizing on a Lions turnover with a 23-yard Jay Feely field goal. The Lions got a turnover of their own, as DeAndre Levy returned an interception 66 yards for a touchdown, making the score 21–13. The Cardinals finished the third quarter scoring with a 43-yard Feely field goal to close the score to 21–16. Feely hit again from 33 yards early in the fourth quarter to make the score 21–19. A pass interference penalty by Bill Bentley put the ball on the Lions 1-yard line late in the final quarter, and Arizona's Rashard Mendenhall plunged over two plays later for a touchdown. Arizona failed on a 2-point conversion, making the final score Cardinals 25, Lions 21. Matthew Stafford was 24-of-36 passing for 278 yards and two touchdowns. Calvin Johnson led all receivers with 6 receptions for 116 yards and two touchdowns. David Akers missed a 47-yard field goal, and had another field goal attempt blocked.

Week 3: at Washington Redskins

Washington took a 7–0 lead in the first quarter when DeAngelo Hall intercepted a Matthew Stafford pass and returned it 17 yards for a touchdown. Detroit tied it on the next possession, when Joique Bell capped an 85-yard drive with a 12-yard TD run. Early in the second quarter, Stafford hit tight end Joseph Fauria with a 5-yard TD pass, putting the Lions up 14–7. A 72-yard Redskins scoring drive was punctuated by an Alfred Morris 30-yard TD run, knotting the score at 14–14. Near the end of the first half, David Akers connected on a 32-yard field goal, sending the Lions to the locker room with a 17–14 lead. The only score of the third quarter came on a John Potter 43-yard field goal, tying the score again at 17–17. The Lions went up 20–17 early in the fourth quarter on a 28-yard field goal from Akers. The Redskins appeared to take the lead on a 57-yard TD pass from Robert Griffin III to Aldrick Robinson, but the play was reversed when replays revealed that Robinson did not maintain possession of the ball when he tumbled to the ground. The Lions took advantage on their next drive, when Stafford hit Calvin Johnson with an 11-yard TD pass, increasing the lead to 27–17. The Redskins got a late 21-yard field goal from John Potter to close the gap to 27–20, but could not gain possession on the ensuing onside kickoff. Matthew Stafford passed for 385 yards and two touchdowns on the day. Nate Burleson led all receivers with 116 yards, while Calvin Johnson tallied 115 receiving yards. Prior to this victory, the Lions had never won a game in Washington, D.C., covering 21 road meetings against the Redskins. They last beat the Redskins on the road in 1935, when the team resided in Boston.

Week 4: vs. Chicago Bears

The 2–1 Lions returned home in Week 4 to face the 3–0 Chicago Bears. Robbie Gould started the scoring for the Bears with a 34-yard field goal, but field goals of 23 and 31 yards by David Akers put the Lions up 6–3. Early in the second quarter, Matt Forté exploded for a 53-yard touchdown run to put Chicago back up, 10–6. The lead was narrowed to 10–9 when Akers connected on a 41-yard field goal. The Lions then reeled off three straight touchdowns in the span of three and a half minutes. Set up by a 57-yard punt return from Micheal Spurlock, Matthew Stafford scored first when he recovered his own fumble in the end zone following a 1-yard quarterback sneak. On Chicago's next possession, Jay Cutler's second interception of the day was returned by Glover Quin 42 yards, to the Bears 2. One play later, Stafford hit Calvin Johnson in the corner of the end zone for a 2-yard TD. On the Lions next possession, Reggie Bush scored on a 37-yard TD run, hurdling Bears safety Major Wright on his way to the end zone. Robbie Gould closed the half with a 28-yard field goal that made the score 30–13. Gould would connect again on a 25-yarder in the third quarter to get the Bears within two touchdowns. On Chicago's next possession, Ndamukong Suh forced a Jay Cutler fumble, then Nick Fairley scooped up the ball and took it the remaining 4 yards for the score to give Detroit a 37–16 lead. David Akers extended it to 40–16 on a 43-yard field goal in the fourth quarter. The Bears attempted a furious rally in the final minutes. Cutler hit Alshon Jeffery on a 14-yard TD pass with four minutes left, then connected with Jeffery again for a 2-point conversion to make the score 40–24. On a potential clock-killing drive, Lions running back Joique Bell lost a fumble, and the Bears took advantage with another Cutler TD pass – this one going 10 yards to Earl Bennett. After another successful 2-point conversion, Chicago was within one score, 40–32. But Detroit's Kris Durham recovered the ensuing onside kick to preserve the victory.

After throwing just one interception in eight previous games against the Lions, Jay Cutler threw three picks in this game, two of them being grabbed by Lions safety Louis Delmas. Reggie Bush rushed 18 times for 139 yards, and had another 34 yards on four receptions.

Week 5: at Green Bay Packers

The Lions were attempting to end a 21-game regular season losing streak at Green Bay's Lambeau Field, but were hampered by injuries to starting wide receivers Nate Burleson and Calvin Johnson, neither of whom could suit up for the game. Neither offense could get much going in the first half. Mason Crosby converted field goals of 26 and 52 yards for the Packers, while David Akers hit a 53-yarder for the Lions, making the halftime score 6–3 in favor of Green Bay. Crosby connected again in the third quarter on a 31-yard field goal. The big blow of the game came just 1:26 later, when Aaron Rodgers found James Jones deep, resulting in an 83-yard touchdown and a 16–3 Green Bay lead. Two more Crosby field goals of 42 and 45 yards put the game out of reach. Matthew Stafford hit Kris Durham with a 13-yard TD pass late in the final quarter to make the score 22–9 (following a failed 2-point conversion), but it was too little, too late.

Week 6: at Cleveland Browns

The Lions struck first on a 1-yard TD pass from Matthew Stafford to tight end Joseph Fauria for the only score of the first quarter. Cleveland did all the scoring in the second quarter. First, Brandon Weeden hit running back Chris Ogbonnaya with a screen pass for a 4-yard touchdown, knotting the score at 7–7. Weeden then cashed in again with 1:16 left in the half, connecting with Greg Little for a 2-yard TD pass. After a Lions three-and-out, the Browns got the ball with enough time to get Billy Cundiff into field goal range, and he converted a 40-yard attempt to make the halftime score 17–7. The second half belonged entirely to the Lions. In the third quarter, Stafford hit Reggie Bush on a short pass, and the running back took it 18 yards for a touchdown, bringing Detroit closer at 17–14. The Lions retook the lead, 21–17, early in the fourth quarter when Stafford again connected with Joseph Fauria, this time on a 23-yard play. David Akers extended the lead to 24–17 when he made good on a 51-yard field goal. After a key interception of Weeden by DeAndre Levy, the Lions put the game away when Stafford and Fauria connected a third time with a 10-yard TD pass play, providing a final score of 31–17.

Matthew Stafford was 25-of-43 and had his first four-TD performance of the season. Joseph Fauria now has only seven catches on the season, but five have gone for touchdowns. Cleveland's Josh Gordon tallied 126 yards receiving in defeat.

Week 7: vs. Cincinnati Bengals

Cincinnati scored on its first possession, when Andy Dalton threw to A. J. Green for an 82-yard touchdown. The Lions tied it later in the first quarter on a 3-yard TD pass from Matthew Stafford to Brandon Pettigrew. A 36-yard field goal by David Akers gave the Lions a 10–7-second quarter lead. But late in the quarter, Akers had a 34-yard field goal attempt blocked by Carlos Dunlap, which the Bengals returned all the way to the Lions 40-yard line despite fumbling during the return. That set up a 12-yard TD strike from Andy Dalton to Marvin Jones just before the first half closed, giving Cincinnati a 14–10 lead. The teams exchanged TD passes in the third quarter. First, Dalton hit Tyler Eifert for a 32-yard TD, and Stafford followed shortly after with a 27-yard TD toss to Calvin Johnson. Mike Nugent connected on a 48-yard field goal late in the third to put the Bengals up 24–17. The Lions tied the game at 24 in the fourth quarter, when Calvin Johnson leaped up and beat three Bengals defenders in the end zone on a 50-yard pass from Matthew Stafford. After the game, Stafford called Johnson's play "one of the best catches I have ever seen." Late in the fourth quarter, a punt by the Bengals Kevin Huber pinned the Lions at their own 6-yard line. Detroit attempted to kill enough clock to get the game to overtime, but could only gain one first down and 17 yards. Detroit punter Sam Martin then shanked a punt that netted only 28 yards before going out of bounds at the Cincinnati 49 with 26 seconds left in the game. Three plays and 15 yards later, Mike Nugent boomed a 54-yard field goal as time expired to give the Bengals a 27–24 victory.

The aerial attack for both teams produced big numbers. Andy Dalton was 24-of-34 for 372 yards and 3 touchdowns, while Matthew Stafford was 28-of-51 for 357 yards and 3 scores. A. J. Green of the Bengals and Calvin Johnson of the Lions both tallied 155 yards receiving on the day.

Week 8: vs. Dallas Cowboys

The Lions needed all 60 minutes to overcome four turnovers and a minus-6 differential in penalties to overtake the Dallas Cowboys. The game started slowly, with just three scores in the first half. Detroit struck first with a 90-yard drive, highlighted by an 87-yard pass from Matthew Stafford to Calvin Johnson and capped when the two connected again on a fourth-down 2-yard TD pass. Dallas got a second quarter field goal of 53 yards by Dan Bailey to make the score 7–3. On the Lions next possession, Sean Lee intercepted Stafford for the second time in the game and returned the ball 74 yards to the Lions 4-yard line. Two plays later, Tony Romo hit Dez Bryant with a 5-yard TD pass, giving Dallas a 10–7 halftime lead. Bailey converted on another 53-yard field goal in the third quarter, putting the Cowboys up 13–7. David Akers narrowed the lead to 13–10 with a 20-yard field goal early in the fourth quarter. But Dallas struck on their next possession when Tony Romo connected with Terrance Williams on a 60-yard TD pass play, putting them up by 10. Detroit's Joique Bell capped an 80-yard drive with a 1-yard TD run to cut the lead to 3 again, at 20–17. Dallas again went up 10, as Romo and Bryant hooked up for their second TD pass play of the day, this one going 50 yards. The Lions came back with a 1-yard TD run by Reggie Bush, on a drive that featured a key 54-yard pass from Stafford to Calvin Johnson, cutting the lead to 27–24. The Lions lost the ball on downs with 1:24 left in the game, but Dallas could only take 22 seconds off the clock before Dan Bailey put them up 30–24 with a 44-yard field goal. The Lions began an improbable 80-yard TD drive with just 1:02 remaining on the clock and no time-outs left. Stafford hit Kris Durham with a key 40-yard pass that put the ball at the Cowboys' 23. Stafford then hit Calvin Johnson with a 22-yard pass on the next play that got the ball to the Dallas 1, but the clock was still running. Instead of spiking the ball to stop the clock after the Lions quickly lined up, Matthew Stafford lunged over a pile of linemen and stretched the ball over the goal line for the tying touchdown, with David Akers' extra point giving the Lions a 31–30 victory.

The Lions tallied 623 yards of total offense on the afternoon. Stafford was 33-of-48 for 488 yards and one touchdown. Most of his passing yards were to Calvin Johnson, as the Lions wideout caught 14 balls for 329 yards and one touchdown. Johnson set an NFL record for receiving yards in a regulation game, and was just 7 yards short of the full game record of 336 yards set by Flipper Anderson in a 1989 overtime game. Calvin also tied Lance Alworth's all-time NFL mark with his fifth career game of 200 or more receiving yards. The Lions also became just the second team in the last 56 such games to win despite a minus-4 turnover differential. The only other team to accomplish this was the New England Patriots in a 2007 game against the Miami Dolphins.

Week 10: at Chicago Bears

The Lions entered the game looking to sweep a season series from the Bears for the first time since 2007, and did so. Chicago scored on the game's opening possession when Jay Cutler capped a 65-yard drive with a 32-yard TD pass to Brandon Marshall. The Lions tied the game at 7 later in the first quarter when Matthew Stafford found Kris Durham in the back of the end zone with a 5-yard TD pass. On the opening drive of the third quarter, Stafford hit Calvin Johnson with a 4-yard TD pass to put the Lions up 14–7. The Bears narrowed the lead to one point with Robbie Gould field goals of 25 and 32 yards. With 2:22 left in the game, Stafford and Johnson connected again, this time on a 14-yard TD pass play, putting the Lions up 21–13. Josh McCown, who relieved an injured Cutler, led the Bears on a 74-yard TD drive, capped by an 11-yard pass to Brandon Marshall for the score. Needing a two-point conversion to tie the game, McCown's pass to Dante Rosario sailed out of the end zone, but Detroit's Willie Young was called for roughing the passer, giving the Bears another chance from the 1-yard line. The Bears attempted a rushing play for the conversion, but Nick Fairley tackled Matt Forté behind the line of scrimmage, ending the Bears hopes.

Calvin Johnson's second touchdown reception of the game gave him 63 touchdown catches in his Lions career, surpassing Herman Moore's previous team record of 62. The win secured the Lions the #1 spot in the NFC North division, the first time they have held that spot alone since Week 5 of the 2005 season.

Week 11: at Pittsburgh Steelers

Week 11 saw the Lions trying to win their first game in Pittsburgh since 1955. The Steelers jumped out to an early 14–0 lead, when Ben Roethlisberger hit Antonio Brown with TD passes of 34 and 47 yards on consecutive drives. Detroit got on the board in the second quarter with a 35-yard David Akers field goal, but Pittsburgh went up by 14 again when Shaun Suisham connected on a 25-yard field goal. The Lions made the score 17–10 on the first play of their next possession, when Matthew Stafford found Calvin Johnson for a 79-yard TD pass play. After a 34-yard Suisham field goal, the Lions drew within 3 points when Stafford and Johnson connected again, this time for a 19-yard TD. The Lions took their first lead, 24–20, on a Joique Bell 2-yard run late in the quarter. Detroit had a chance to go up by 11 in the closing seconds of the first half, but after three incomplete passes from the Steelers' 1-yard line, they settled for a 19-yard Akers field goal to make the score 27–20. As the weather turned bad and the field got sloppy in the second half, so did the Lions offense. A 21-yard Suisham field goal was the only score of the third quarter, drawing the Steelers within 4 points at 27–23. The Lions got inside the Pittsburgh 10-yard line on their next possession, but failed to score on three straight plays before calling in the field goal unit. The Lions attempted a fake that failed, and following a Sam Martin fumble, the Steelers took over on their own 3-yard line. Roethlisberger engineered a game-winning 97-yard drive, culminating in a 1-yard TD pass to Will Johnson. The Steelers iced it on their next possession, going up 37–27 after Roethlisberger hit Jerricho Cotchery with a 20-yard TD pass.

Matthew Stafford was 19-of-46 passing in the game for 362 yards, including just 3-for-16 in the second half, with many of his passes being dropped by Lions receivers. Ben Roethlisberger, meanwhile, went 29-of-45 for 367 yards and four touchdowns. Calvin Johnson led all players with 179 receiving yards and two touchdowns, but he was shut out in the second half. Despite the loss, Stafford (16,005 yards) passed Bobby Layne's Lion record of 15,710 career passing yards, while Johnson tied Herman Moore's team mark of four consecutive 1,000-yard receiving seasons.

Week 12: vs. Tampa Bay Buccaneers

The Lions returned home to face the 2–8 Tampa Bay Buccaneers. The Bucs got on the board first with a 38-yard Rian Lindell field goal for the only scoring of the first quarter. Detroit responded early in the second with a 5-yard TD pass from Matthew Stafford to Nate Burleson, who was playing in his first game since Week 3. Tiquan Underwood put Tampa Bay back on top, 10–7 when he hauled in a 7-yard TD pass from Mike Glennon. The Lions came back with a 10-yard Matthew Stafford-to-Joseph Fauria TD connection. Late in the half, Leonard Johnson picked off a Stafford pass intended for Brandon Pettigrew and returned it 48 yards for a touchdown, sending the Bucs to the locker room with a 17–14 lead. The Lions jumped ahead for the third time in the game, 21–17, when Stafford hit Pettigrew for an 18-yard TD pass. Tampa Bay completed the scoring when Mike Glennon again connected with Tiquan Underwood, this time on an 85-yard bomb, making the final score 24–21. The Lions had two potential game-tying or game-winning drives end on turnovers. Kris Durham fumbled after making a reception in Bucs territory, and with 47 seconds left in the game, Calvin Johnson had a potential catch at the Bucs 5-yard line stripped from his hands, resulting in a game-clinching interception by Johnthan Banks.

The Lions had a season-high five turnovers in the game, while the Buccaneers won their third straight game after an 0–8 start to the season.

Week 13: vs. Green Bay Packers
Thanksgiving Day game

Despite three turnovers and a missed field goal in the first half, the Lions rebounded to dominate the Packers, earning their first win on Thanksgiving Day since 2003. After David Akers and Mason Crosby exchanged field goals, Green Bay took their first and only lead of the day in the second quarter when Nick Perry forced a Matthew Stafford fumble that Morgan Burnett returned for a 1-yard touchdown. Detroit tied the score at 10 after Stafford found Jeremy Ross in the end zone with a 5-yard TD pass. A 1-yard Reggie Bush TD run gave the Lions a 17–10 halftime lead. The second half was all Lions. Calvin Johnson hauled in a 20-yard pass from Stafford for a 24–10 Lions lead. Late in the third quarter, Ndamukong Suh sacked Matt Flynn in the end zone for a safety. After the ensuing free kick, Joique Bell finished off a 56-yard drive with a 1-yard TD run to put Detroit up 33–10. Kevin Ogletree completed the scoring by catching a 20-yard TD pass from Stafford to account for a 40–10 final score.

Matthew Stafford was 22-of-35 passing, hitting nine different receivers for 330 yards and three touchdowns, while Reggie Bush had 182 yards from scrimmage (117 rushing, 65 receiving). With 101 yards receiving in the game, Calvin Johnson now has 4,944 receiving yards over the 2011 to 2013 seasons, surpassing Jerry Rice's previous NFL record for receiving yards over a three-season stretch (4,850 yards from 1993 to 1995). The Lions offense outgained the Packers in the game 561 yards to 126 yards, while Detroit's defense sacked Matt Flynn seven times.

Week 14: at Philadelphia Eagles

This game was well known for being played in a blinding blizzard, with at least 4 inches falling throughout the game. The Lions were leading after the first 3 quarters, but the Eagles scored 4 touchdowns in the 4th quarter and outscored Detroit 28–6 in the 4th, ultimately winning 34–20. The loss dropped Detroit to 7–6, and now have only won 1 out of their last 4 games

Week 15: vs. Baltimore Ravens

The Lions hoped to keep their slim lead for the NFC North division title. Playing against the Ravens, Detroit would rally in the first quarter before Baltimore's Justin Tucker kicked three field goals to give his team a halftime lead, 9–7. After trailing 12–10 in the third quarter, the Lions would take a 16–12 lead with another touchdown and a failed 2-point conversion. Turnovers again doomed the Lions. Matthew Stafford threw an interception, the third Lions turnover, late in the game, with Detroit clinging to a 16–15 lead. That would give Justin Tucker a chance at a 61-yard field goal, which he converted to give Baltimore an 18–16 victory. With the shocking loss, the Lions fell to 7–7 and third place within their division.

Week 16: vs. New York Giants

In their home finale, the Lions met the Giants in a game that the Lions needed to win to stay in the division race. The Lions were having trouble scoring and could only muster a field goal before halftime while the Giants built 13 points to maintain their lead. The Lions would manage to return by scoring 17 unanswered points in the third and fourth quarters. However, an interception thrown by Stafford led to the Giants tying the game. As the clock ran out with the score tied, Head Coach Jim Schwartz decided to let the game go into overtime despite Detroit possessing two timeouts. This led to many fans booing at the decision, and Schwartz appeared to yell angrily at the booing crowd. After both teams went 3 and out with the Giants having the starting possession, the Giants managed to record a 45-yard field goal to win the game and seal the Lions' fate.

Week 17: at Minnesota Vikings

To end the season, the Lions had a re-match against division rival Minnesota Vikings in the last-ever game at the Metrodome in Minneapolis. With both teams resting injured superstars (Adrian Peterson for Minnesota and Calvin Johnson for Detroit), the Vikings won the low-scoring contest, 14–13.

Standings

Division

Conference

Staff

References

External links
 

Detroit
Detroit Lions seasons
2013 in sports in Michigan